The Monthly Index of Medical Specialities or MIMS is a pharmaceutical prescribing reference guide published in the United Kingdom since 1959 by Haymarket Media Group. MIMS is also published internationally by various organisations, including in Australia, New Zealand, China, Hong Kong, India, Indonesia, Japan, Korea, Malaysia, Myanmar, the Philippines, Singapore, Thailand, and Vietnam. 

The UK guide contains information about branded and generic drugs in the UK formulary. The print title is published quarterly, freely available to all practice-based UK general practitioners, and on a paid basis to subscribers. An online version is available, with all drug listings available to view for free.

Concise drug monographs form the core of MIMS; these include safety information, details of the active ingredient, presentation, price, indication, dosage and manufacturer. In addition, the book includes drug comparison tables, and summaries of clinical guidance.

Drugs that are blacklisted (not prescribable on the NHS in the UK edition or approved by the TGA in Australia, etc.) or unlicensed are not included in the guide, nor does it provide information about off-label use.

Publications 
Haymarket Group also publishes trade magazines.

Conferences 
Several one-day clinical conferences are held each year on topics such as dermatology, women's health, diabetes, and respiratory disease.

MIMS Learning 
MIMS Learning is an educational website for general practitioners and nurses offering clinical education modules. The website also has an integrated magazine, also named MIMS Learning.

External links
MIMS UK
MIMS Learning

Pharmacology journals
Publications established in 1959
Quarterly journals
English-language journals